Francine Moraes (born 1 January 1981, in Sorocaba) is a Brazilian handballer who plays for Hypo Niederösterreich as a right back. She also plays in the Brazilian national team, and participated at the 2011 World Women's Handball Championship in Brazil and the 2012 Summer Olympics.

References

1981 births
Living people
People from Sorocaba
Brazilian female handball players
Expatriate handball players
Brazilian expatriate sportspeople in Austria
Handball players at the 2011 Pan American Games
Handball players at the 2012 Summer Olympics
Olympic handball players of Brazil
Pan American Games gold medalists for Brazil
Pan American Games medalists in handball
Medalists at the 2011 Pan American Games
Sportspeople from São Paulo (state)
21st-century Brazilian women